The 1991 Fresno State Bulldogs football team represented California State University, Fresno as a member of the Big West Conference during the 1990 NCAA Division I-A football season. Led by 14th-year head coach Jim Sweeney, Fresno State compiled an overall record of 10–2 with a mark of 6–1 in conference play, sharing the Big West title with San Jose State. The Bulldogs played their home games at Bulldog Stadium in Fresno, California.

Fresno State earned NCAA Division I-A postseason bowl game berth in 1991. They played the Mid-American Conference (MAC) champion Bowling Green in the 11th annual California Bowl inat Bulldog Stadium on December 14. The Bulldogs were defeated by Bowling Green, 28–21, breaking their four-game bowl win streak.

In the fourth game of the season, Fresno State scored a school record 94 points against the New Mexico, including 66 in the first half. Both of those marks are school records that still stand as of the end of the 2021 season.

Schedule

Team players in the NFL
The following were selected in the 1992 NFL Draft.

References

Fresno State
Fresno State Bulldogs football seasons
Big West Conference football champion seasons
Fresno State Bulldogs football